Long and Kees was an architecture firm based in Minneapolis, Minnesota active for a twelve-year period starting in 1885 and ending in 1897. Named for its two proprietors, Franklin B. Long (1842–1912) and Frederick Kees (1852-1927), the firm designed several notable churches, offices, schools and houses, including Minneapolis City Hall. Most of the buildings designed by Long and Kees reflect the Richardsonian-Romanesque style.

History 
The firm was established in 1885 when Franklin Long, having recently relocated to Minneapolis from Chicago, partnered with Maryland-born Frederick Kees. In later years, Long added his son Louis Long as a partner, as well as Lowell A. Lamoreaux. After Long and Kees disbanded their firm, Kees partnered with Serenus Colburn starting in 1898 and ending in 1921.

Legacy 
Many of Long and Kees's buildings remain standing today, such as the Lumber Exchange Building (1885), Hennepin Center for the Arts (1888), the Flour Exchange Building (1892), Hawthorn Terrace Apartments (20-26 N. 15th St., 1892), William Nott residence (15 Groveland Terrace, 1892) and Minneapolis City Hall (designed in 1897; completed in 1906).

At the same time, a number of buildings designed by Long and Kees have been demolished, such as the first Minneapolis Public Library (1889), the Minneapolis Corn Exchange, and Donaldson's Glass Block.

References

Architects from Minnesota
Defunct companies based in Minneapolis